St. Olaf’s Church or St. Olav's Church in Tallinn, Estonia, is believed to have been built in the 12th century and to  have been the centre for old Tallinn's Scandinavian community before Denmark conquered Tallinn in 1219. Its dedication relates to King Olaf II of Norway (also known as Saint Olaf, 995–1030). The first known written records referring to the church date back to 1267. It was extensively rebuilt during the 14th century.

History
St. Olaf's Church was originally part of the united western tradition of Christianity, whose polity continues in the Roman Catholic Church today. However, during the Reformation the church became part of the Lutheran tradition. Eventually proving surplus to the requirements of the Evangelical Lutheran Church in Tallinn, St. Olaf's Church became a Baptist church in 1950. The Baptist congregation continues to meet at St. Olaf's today.

From 1944 until 1991, the Soviet KGB used St. Olaf's Church's spire as a radio tower and surveillance point.

Height
In 1590, the total height of the church tower was 115.35–125 m. The tower has been hit by lightning around 10 times, and the whole church has burned down three times throughout its known existence.  According to one source it may have been the tallest building in the world from 1549 to 1625, but this claim is highly speculative. After several rebuildings, its spire is now 123.8 meters tall.

See also
List of tallest churches
List of tallest structures built before the 20th century

Images

References

External links

Tourist Sights in Estonia

13th-century churches in Estonia
Churches completed in 1519
Churches in Tallinn
Baptist churches in Europe
Gothic architecture in Estonia
Kesklinn, Tallinn
13th-century establishments in Estonia
Tallinn
Tallinn Old Town